Simon Bond may refer to:

 Simon Bond (1947–2011), author of 101 Uses for a Dead Cat
 Simon Bond (Doctors), a character from Doctors